The Kantegir (Xan-Tigër) is a left tributary of the Yenisey in Siberia, Russia. It begins on the northern slopes of the ridge Saylyg-Khem-Taiga, the Republic of Tyva.

Kantegir is a river with an average fall of 4.5 m/km, it is one of the most beautiful rivers of the Western Sayan mountains. It flows in virtually unpopulated terrain in the area of black coniferous taiga. Scenic mountain top Kantegira heavily indented tributaries and dry padyami with signs of spring watercourses. Taiga covers the rocky shore of the river, climbing to the tops of mountains rising to 100–150 m above the bottom of the valley Kantegirskoy. Valley Kantegira throughout clenched mountains to 100–200 m, the valley slopes are steep, with rocky outcrops of granite, shale, sandstone.

References 

Rivers of Tuva
Rivers of Krasnoyarsk Krai
Rivers of Khakassia